Alberto Gerbo (born 9 November 1989) is an Italian footballer who plays as a midfielder for  club Juve Stabia.

Club career
On 1 August 2012, Gerbo signed with Serie C club Latina.

On 30 July 2019, he signed a 2-year contract with Ascoli.

On 31 January 2020, he joined Crotone on loan until the end of the 2019–20 season.

On 25 January 2021 he moved to Cosenza on a 1.5-year contract.

On 1 September 2022, Gerbo signed a two-year contract with Juve Stabia.

References

External links
 Career summary by lega-calcio
 Gerbo moves to Latina

1989 births
People from Valenza
Footballers from Piedmont
Sportspeople from the Province of Alessandria
Living people
Italian footballers
Serie B players
Serie C players
Serie D players
Inter Milan players
A.C. Ancona players
U.S. Triestina Calcio 1918 players
A.S. Gubbio 1910 players
Latina Calcio 1932 players
Calcio Foggia 1920 players
Ascoli Calcio 1898 F.C. players
F.C. Crotone players
Cosenza Calcio players
S.S. Juve Stabia players
Association football midfielders